The blue knifefish (Labracoglossa nitida) is a species of marine  ray-finned fish, a member of the subfamily Scorpidinae of the sea chub family Kyphosidae.

References

Scorpidinae
Fish described in 1916